Francisco Javier Rodríguez Vílchez (born 17 June 1978), known simply as Francisco, is a Spanish former footballer who played as a striker, currently a manager.

His career was closely associated with Almería as both a player and manager, and he started coaching the first team at the age of 35. In the former capacity, he amassed Segunda División totals of 185 matches and 45 goals over six seasons, also representing Granada 74 and Alicante in the competition.

Playing career
Francisco was born in Almería, Andalusia. After starting out with local Polideportivo Almería he joined Valencia CF, never making it however past its B side. He returned to his hometown in 2002, joining Unión Deportiva in the second division and scoring at an impressive rate.

In 2004–05, as his contract expired, Francisco seized the opportunity to make his La Liga debut and signed with Albacete Balompié. The season was a disaster, with relegation for the team and only three goals for the player – he netted against Real Madrid, albeit in a 6–1 away loss.

Subsequently, Francisco returned to his previous club, and was fairly played by as it achieved a first-ever promotion to the top flight in 2007, but would never play in that tier again, resuming (with little individual and team success) his career in divisions two and three.

Coaching career
Francisco started his managerial career in 2010, coaching in various categories at his main club Almería. On 29 June 2013, after two seasons with the reserves, he was appointed at the helm of the first team, recently returned to the top flight.

After narrowly avoiding relegation in the last matchday, and winning La Liga Manager of the Month for November and May, Francisco inked a new one-year deal at the Estadio de los Juegos Mediterráneos on 27 May 2014. On 9 December, however, he was relieved of his duties after only managing two points out of 24.

On 13 December 2016, after more than two years unemployed, Francisco was named manager of UCAM Murcia CF of division two. The following 21 June, he was appointed at CD Lugo from the same league.

On 28 June 2018, Francisco signed with Córdoba CF still in the second division, but he resigned on 2 August due to the club's poor financial situation. He returned to the top tier on 10 October, replacing the dismissed Leo Franco at SD Huesca. In May 2019, after their relegation, he turned down a new contract.

Francisco returned to the second division on 30 June 2020, taking over from José Luis Martí at fifth-placed Girona FC for the last six games of the season and the following campaign. He left on 30 June as his contract expired, after the side missed out on promotion twice in the finals.

On 28 November 2021, Francisco was appointed at top-flight Elche CF until the end of the campaign. On 4 October 2022, with his team in last place, he was sacked.

Managerial statistics

Honours

Manager
La Liga: Manager of the Month November 2013, May 2014

References

External links

1978 births
Living people
Footballers from Almería
Spanish footballers
Association football forwards
La Liga players
Segunda División players
Segunda División B players
UD Almería players
Valencia CF Mestalla footballers
Polideportivo Ejido footballers
Albacete Balompié players
Granada 74 CF footballers
Alicante CF footballers
Orihuela CF players
Spanish football managers
La Liga managers
Segunda División managers
Segunda División B managers
UD Almería B managers
UD Almería managers
UCAM Murcia CF managers
CD Lugo managers
Córdoba CF managers
SD Huesca managers
Girona FC managers
Elche CF managers